Alfredo Pelliccioni (born 21 June 1953) is a Sammarinese sports shooter. He competed at the 1976 Summer Olympics, the 1980 Summer Olympics and the 1984 Summer Olympics.

References

1953 births
Living people
Sammarinese male sport shooters
Olympic shooters of San Marino
Shooters at the 1976 Summer Olympics
Shooters at the 1980 Summer Olympics
Shooters at the 1984 Summer Olympics
Place of birth missing (living people)